"What I Did for Love" is a song by French music producer David Guetta. It was released as the third single from his sixth studio album, Listen (2014). It features vocals by Scottish recording artist Emeli Sandé. It was released officially on 20 February 2015 in the United Kingdom. The song was written by Guetta, Giorgio Tuinfort, Breyan Stanley Isaac, Jason Evigan, Sam Martin, and Sean Douglas. Japanese recording artist Namie Amuro recorded an alternate version of the song for inclusion on her album Genic and Japanese edition of Listen Again, this version was released as a promotional single on 1 July 2015.

Promotion
Guetta and Sandé performed "What I Did for Love" on The X Factor UK on 22 November 2014. BBC soap opera EastEnders also used the song as part of their live episode on 20 February 2015.

Track listing

Charts

Weekly charts

Year-end charts

Certifications

Release history

References

2015 singles
David Guetta songs
Emeli Sandé songs
2014 songs
Parlophone singles
Songs written by David Guetta
Songs written by Giorgio Tuinfort
Songs written by Breyan Isaac
Songs written by Jason Evigan
Songs written by Sam Martin (singer)
Songs written by Sean Douglas (songwriter)
Number-one singles in Israel
Namie Amuro songs
Song recordings produced by David Guetta